Ramses Railway Station, also called Misr Station, is the main railway station of Cairo, Egypt. The name is derived from the Ancient Egyptian Pharaoh Ramses II, whose statue was erected by Nasser on the square there in 1955.

History
The original railway station was built as the terminal of the first rail link from Alexandria to Cairo in 1856. The current building was erected in 1892 and upgraded in 1955. As of January 2001 it was undergoing a major modernisation. In early 2011, following the Egyptian Uprising, Ramses station was fully upgraded and air conditioned with new marble flooring across the station and the addition of escalators. Some critics believe that the modernisations were too modern and destroyed much of the building's original style.

Huda Sha'arawi, the Egyptian feminist, famously removed her veil here in 1923.

The classic film Cairo Station (1958) was made at Ramses Station.

Structure
Outside of the station used to be the statue of Ramses II that was relocated to the area of Giza on 25 August 2006, in preparation for its eventual installation in the Grand Egyptian Museum. It was eventually placed there in 2018.

The famous sculpture of Mahmoud Mokhtar, Nahdat Misr (Egypt's Awakening), was originally installed outside the station in 1928, but was removed to its current location near Cairo University in the 1950s.

Facilities in the station include a left luggage office, a post office, ATMs, a pharmacy and a tourist information office.

Train services
Ramses Station is served by the vast majority of Egyptian National Railways' intercity passenger services.

Connecting services
The railway station has also a connection to Cairo Metro Lines 1 and 2  via the nearby "Al-Shohadaa/Martyrs" Station; city buses, microbuses and Cairo taxis are also available.

Incidents

On 27 February 2019 a train hit a buffer stop at the station. According to Egypt's Prosecutor General Nabil Sadek, one train driver had left his train to fight with another train driver; thereafter, an unmanned train struck a barrier. The resulting explosion and fire killed at least 25 people and wounded at least 47 people. Some victims' bodies were burned beyond recognition. Egypt's Transportation Minister Hisham Arafat resigned shortly after the incident.

Gallery

See also
Egyptian National Railways

References

External links

Transport in Cairo
Buildings and structures in Cairo
Railway stations opened in 1856
Buildings and structures completed in 1892
Railway stations in Egypt
19th-century architecture in Egypt